"Razom nas bahato" ("Together we are many") is a hip hop song by GreenJolly, which became the unofficial anthem of the Ukrainian Orange Revolution in 2004. The literal translation of the chorus line is "Together we are many, we cannot be defeated" (Ukr. Разом нас багато, нас не подолати Russian Вместе нас много, нас не победить).

Background
The song deliberately resembles a title of a famous Chilean song of Quilapayún used by the Unidad Popular, "El pueblo unido jamás será vencido" ("The people united will never be defeated"), written by composer Sergio Ortega.

The original song was entirely in Ukrainian, and was written specifically to refer to the 2004 presidential election, even going so far as to name Presidential candidate Viktor Yushchenko by name.

2005 Eurovision Song Contest entry
The song was the  entry at the Eurovision Song Contest 2005 in Kyiv. As a requirement of the song contest rules, forbidding direct political references, lyrics mentioning Yuschenko were removed. The verses were rewritten to include both Ukrainian and English lyrics, while the chorus' sentence "Razom nas bahato" was repeated in eight languages: Ukrainian, Polish, German, Spanish, Czech, French and Russian.

A group of Polish rappers created a remix of "Razom nas bahato" entitled "Jest nas wielu", that became popular in Poland.

See also
 Protest song

References

External links
 "Razom Nas Bahato" - lyrics and video on the GreenJolly official web site
 "Razom Nas Bahato" - lyrics and video on the Eurovision official web site
 Original (pre-Eurovision Song Contest 2005) protest lyrics reprinted by The Ukrainian Weekly

2004 songs
Politics of Ukraine
Eurovision songs of Ukraine
Eurovision songs of 2005
Orange Revolution
Ukrainian patriotic songs